Whanganui, also spelled Wanganui, is a city in the Manawatū-Whanganui region of New Zealand. The city is located on the west coast of the North Island at the mouth of the Whanganui River, New Zealand's longest navigable waterway.

Whanganui is the ancestral home of Te Āti Haunui-a-Pāpārangi and other Whanganui Māori tribes. The New Zealand Company began to settle the area in 1840, establishing its second settlement after Wellington. In the early years most European settlers came via Wellington. Whanganui greatly expanded in the 1870s, and freezing works, woollen mills, phosphate works and wool stores were established in the town. Today, much of Whanganui's economy relates directly to the fertile and prosperous farming hinterland.

Like several New Zealand urban areas, it was officially designated a city until an administrative reorganisation in 1989, and is now run by a District Council. Although the city was called Wanganui from 1854, in February 2009, the New Zealand Geographic Board recommended the spelling be changed to "Whanganui". In December 2009, the government decided that, while either spelling was acceptable, Crown agencies would use the Whanganui spelling.

On 17 November 2015, Land Information New Zealand (LINZ) announced that Wanganui District would be renamed Whanganui District. This changed the official name of the District Council, and, because Whanganui is not a city but a district, it changed the official name of the urban area as well.

Toponymy
Whanga nui is a Māori language phrase meaning "big bay" or "big harbour". The first name of the European settlement was Petre (pronounced Peter), after Lord Petre, an officer of the New Zealand Company, but it was never popular and was officially changed to "Wanganui" in 1854.

Controversy over Wanganui/Whanganui spelling

In 1991 the New Zealand Geographic Board considered demands from some local Māori to change the name of the river to Whanganui. During a three-month consultation period, the Wanganui District Council was asked for its views and advised the Board that it opposed the change. Letters of both support and opposition were received during this time. After some deliberation, the Board decided to change the spelling of the river's name from "Wanganui" to "Whanganui".

A non-binding referendum was held in Wanganui in 2006, where 82% voted to retain the city's name "Wanganui" without an 'h'. Turnout was 55.4%. Despite the clear results, the spelling of the name continued to be surrounded by significant controversy.

Iwi group Te Rūnanga o Tupoho applied to the New Zealand Geographic Board to change the city's name to "Whanganui" in February 2009, and in late March the Board found there were grounds for the change. The public was given three months to comment on the proposed change, beginning in mid-May. The public submissions were relatively equal, with a slim majority in favour of keeping the status quo. Wanganui Mayor Michael Laws spoke strongly against the proposed change. A second referendum was held in Wanganui in May 2009, and residents again overwhelmingly rejected changing the city's name, with 22% voting to change it to "Whanganui" and 77% voting to retain the name as "Wanganui". Voter turnout was 61%, the highest in a Wanganui referendum, reflecting the widespread controversy. Recognising that the decision was ultimately political in nature, not linguistic, in September 2009 the Geographic Board handed the decision to the Minister for Land Information. Despite the referendum results, the Geographic Board recommended to the Minister that the name should be spelt "Whanganui". In December 2009 the government decided that while either spelling was acceptable, Crown agencies would use the spelling "Whanganui", amending the act to allow other official documents to use "Wanganui", as an alternative official name, if desired.

On 17 November 2015 Land Information New Zealand Toitū te whenua (LINZ) announced that Wanganui District would be renamed to Whanganui District. This changed the official name of the District Council, and, because Whanganui is not a city council but a district, the official name of the urban area as well. On 19 November 2015 the name change was officially gazetted. In September 2019 the region that Whanganui District Council is part of was renamed from Manawatu-Wanganui to Manawatū-Whanganui.

History

Māori settlement

The area around the mouth of the Whanganui river was a major site of pre-European Māori settlement. The pā named Pūtiki (a contraction of Pūtikiwharanui) was and is home to the Ngāti Tūpoho hapū of the iwi Te Āti Haunui-a-Pāpārangi. It took its name from the legendary explorer Tamatea Pōkai Whenua, who sent a servant ashore to find flax for tying up his topknot (pūtiki).

In the 1820s coastal tribes in the area assaulted the Kapiti Island stronghold of Ngāti Toa chief Te Rauparaha. Te Rauparaha retaliated in 1830, sacking Pūtiki and slaughtering the inhabitants.

European settlement

The first European traders arrived in 1831, followed in 1840 by missionaries Octavius Hadfield and Henry Williams who collected signatures for the Treaty of Waitangi. On 20 June 1840, the Revd John Mason, Mrs Mason, Mr Richard Matthews (a lay catechist) and his wife Johanna arrived to establish a mission station of the Church Missionary Society (CMS). The Revd Richard Taylor joined the CMS mission station in 1843. The Revd Mason drowned on 5 January 1843 while crossing the Turakina River. By 1844 the brick church built by Mason was inadequate to meet the needs of the congregation and it had been damaged in an earthquake. A new church was built under the supervision of Taylor, with the timber supplied by each pā on the river in proportion to its size and number of Christians.

After the New Zealand Company had settled Wellington it looked for other suitable places for settlers. William Wakefield, younger brother of Edward Gibbon Wakefield, negotiated the sale of 40,000 acres in 1840, and a town named Petre – after Lord Petre, one of the directors of the New Zealand Company – was established four kilometres from the river mouth. The settlement was threatened in 1846 by Te Mamaku, a chief from up the Whanganui River. The British military arrived on 13 December 1846 to defend the township. Two stockades, the Rutland and York, were built to defend the settlers. Two minor battles were fought on 19 May and 19 July 1847 and after a stalemate the up river iwi returned home. By 1850 Te Mamaku was receiving Christian instruction from Revd Taylor. There were further incidents in 1847 when four members of the Gilfillan family were murdered and their house plundered.

The name of the city was officially changed to Wanganui on 20 January 1854. The early years of the new city were problematic. Purchase of land from the local tribes had been haphazard and irregular, and as such many Māori were angered with the influx of Pākehā onto land that they still claimed. It was not until the town had been established for eight years that agreements were finally reached between the colonials and local tribes, and some resentment continued (and still filters through to the present day).

Wanganui grew rapidly after this time, with land being cleared for pasture. The town was a major military centre during the New Zealand Wars of the 1860s, although local Māori at Pūtiki led by Te Keepa Te Rangihiwinui remained friendly to settlers. In 1871 a town bridge was built, followed six years later by a railway bridge at Aramoho. Wanganui was linked by rail to both New Plymouth and Wellington by 1886. The town was incorporated as a Borough on 1 February 1872, with William Hogg Watt the first Mayor. It was then declared a city on 1 July 1924.

Wanganui Women's Political League
As an alternative to the Wanganui chapter of the Women's Christian Temperance Union of New Zealand, Margaret Bullock formed a club for women activists in 1893 originally as the Wanganui Women's Franchise League. Ellen Ballance, the second wife of the former Premier John Ballance was the inaugural president until she left for England. Bullock then served as president when the franchise for women was won and the organisation's name changed to the Women's Political League. The membership rolls reached to nearly 3000 at its height. Monthly meetings focused on feminist scholarly inquiry, and Ellen Ballance donated her husband's library to the club. Bullock and Jessie Williamson led the club's connections with the National Council of Women of New Zealand. By 1903, a year in which Bullock died and Williamson moved to Christchurch, the club's activities had declined and its library collection was donated to the local public library.

20th century

Perhaps Wanganui's biggest scandal happened in 1920, when Mayor Charles Mackay shot and wounded a young poet, Walter D'Arcy Cresswell, who had been blackmailing him over his homosexuality. Mackay served seven years in prison and his name was erased from the town's civic monuments, while Cresswell (himself homosexual) was praised as a "wholesome-minded young man". Mackay's name was restored to the foundation stone of the Sarjeant Gallery in 1985.

The Whanganui River catchment is seen as a sacred area to Māori, and the Whanganui region is still seen as a focal point for any resentment over land ownership. In 1995, Moutoa Gardens in Wanganui, known to local Māori as Pakaitore, were occupied for 79 days in a mainly peaceful protest by the Whanganui iwi over land claims.

Wanganui was the site of the New Zealand Police Law Enforcement System (LES) from 1976 to 1995. An early Sperry mainframe computer-based intelligence and data management system, it was known colloquially as the "Wanganui Computer". The data centre housing it was subject to New Zealand's highest-profile suicide bombing on 18 November 1982 when anarchist Neil Roberts detonated a gelignite bomb in the entry foyer. Roberts was the only casualty of the bombing.

Geography
Whanganui is on the South Taranaki Bight, close to the mouth of the Whanganui River. Most of the city lies on the river's northwestern bank, because of the greater extent of flat land. The river is crossed by five bridges: Cobham Bridge, City Bridge, Dublin Street Bridge and Aramoho Railway Bridge (rail and pedestrians only) and a Cycle bridge which was opened in 2020.

Both Mount Ruapehu and Mount Taranaki can be seen from Durie Hill and other vantage points around the city.

Suburbs and localities
The suburbs within Whanganui include (clockwise from central Watt Fountain):

Northeast: Whanganui East, Bastia Hill, Aramoho
East: Durie Hill
South: Pūtiki
West: Gonville, Castlecliff, Tawhero
Northwest: Springvale St Johns Hill, Otamatea

Climate

Several light frosts are normally experienced in winter. The river is prone to flooding after heavy rain in the catchment, and in June 2015 record flooding occurred with 100 households evacuated. Whanganui's climate is particularly moderate. In 2012, the Federated Farmers Whanganui president, Brian Doughty, said the district's temperate climate meant any type of farming was viable.

Demographics
The Whanganui urban area had a population of 39,720 at the 2018 New Zealand census, an increase of 3,078 people (8.4%) since the 2013 census, and an increase of 1,992 people (5.3%) since the 2006 census (the population decreased between the 2006 and 2013 censuses). There were 18,930 males and 20,793 females, giving a sex ratio of 0.91 males per female. Of the total population, 7,854 people (19.8%) were aged up to 15 years, 6,867 (17.3%) were 15 to 29, 16,551 (41.7%) were 30 to 64, and 8,445 (21.3%) were 65 or older.

Ethnicities were 78.0% European/Pākehā, 27.2% Māori, 3.8% Pacific peoples, 4.5% Asian, and 1.7% other ethnicities (totals add to more than 100% since people could identify with multiple ethnicities).\

Economy
In 2013, 2014, 2015 and 2016 Whanganui was included in the world's Smart21 Intelligent Communities by the Intelligent Community Forum.

Whanganui has a strong industry base, with a history of niche manufacturing. Current businesses include Q-West Boat Builders, based at the Port who have built boats for customers from around New Zealand and the world and were awarded a contract in 2015 to build two 34-meter passenger ferries for Auckland ferry company Fullers. Pacific Helmets is another example of award-winning niche manufacturing in the district, winning a Silver Pin at the Best Design Awards in October 2015. Heads Road is Whanganui's main industrial area and is home to a number of manufacturing and engineering operations. The Wanganui Port, once the centre of industrial transport, still has some traffic but is more noted for the Q-West boat building operation there. F. Whitlock & Sons Ltd was a notable company first established in 1902.

Much of Whanganui's economy relates directly to the fertile and prosperous farming hinterland near the town. Whanganui is well known for embracing the production of several new pear varieties, including the Crimson Gem. In May 2016 it was reported that the majority of the Whanganui pear crop had been wiped out before the upcoming pear season.

Whanganui District

A large proportion of this is within the Whanganui National Park, established in 1986.

The region is known for its outstanding natural environment with the Whanganui Awa (River) at its heart. Every bend and rapid of the river (there are 239 listed rapids) has a guardian, or kaitiaki, who maintains the mauri (life force) of that stretch of the river.

Whanganui hapū (sub-tribes) were renowned for their canoeing skills and maintained extensive networks of weirs and fishing traps along the River. Generations of river iwi have learned to use and protect this great taonga (treasure), and on 13 September 2012 the Whanganui River became the first river in the world to gain recognition as a legal identity.

Today the river and its surrounds are used for a number of recreational activities including kayaking, jet boating, tramping, cycling and camping. A national cycleway has recently opened, which takes cyclists from the 'mountains to the sea'.

In the local government reorganisation of the 1980s, Wanganui District Council resulted from the amalgamation in 1989 of Wanganui County Council, most of Waitotara County Council, a small part of Stratford County Council, and Wanganui City Council. Hamish McDouall was elected mayor in the 2016 local government elections.

All but some  people in the Whanganui District live in the township itself, meaning there are few prominent outlying settlements. A small but notable village is Jerusalem, which was home to Mother Mary Joseph Aubert and the poet James K. Baxter.

The Whanganui District is also home to other settlements with small populations, including Kaitoke, Upokongaro, Kai Iwi/Mowhanau, Aberfeldy, Westmere, Pākaraka, Marybank, Okoia and Fordell.

Culture

Cultural institutions
Whanganui has a strong cultural and recreational focus. Queen's Park (Pukenamu) in the central township has several cultural institutions including the Sarjeant Gallery, the Whanganui Regional Museum, the Davis Library, the Alexander Heritage and Research Library, and the Whanganui War Memorial Centre. Whanganui is home to New Zealand's only glass school and is renowned for its glass art.

Sarjeant Gallery collection

There are more than 8,000 artworks in the Sarjeant Gallery, initially focused on 19th- and early 20th-century British and European art but, given the expansive terms of the will of benefactor Henry Sarjeant, the collection now spans the 16th century through to the 21st century. Among the collections are historic and modern works in all media – on paper, sculptures, pottery, ceramics and glass; bronze works; video art; and paintings by contemporary artists and old masters. The Gallery holds notable works by Edward Coley Burne-Jones, Domenico Piola, Frank Brangwyn, Bernardino Poccetti, Gaspard Dughet, William Richmond, William Etty, Lelio Orsi, Frederick Goodall, Augustus John and others. Its New Zealand holdings include six works by Wanganui artist Herbert Ivan Babbage and a major collection of works by the Whanganui-born Edith Collier.

Whanganui Regional Museum collection
The Whanganui Regional Museum collection has been growing since the first items were displayed in Samuel Henry Drew's shop window in Victoria Avenue. It includes artwork by John Tiffin Stewart.

Potters
Potters have a long history of working in the area, such as Rick Rudd, Paul Rayner and Ivan Vostinar.

Glass artists
Local glass artists include Kathryn Wightman, Lisa Walsh, and Claudia Borella.

Theatre
A repertory group has been active in the town since 1933.

Opera
Since 1994, The New Zealand Opera School has been hosted at Whanganui Collegiate School.

Landmarks and buildings

Pukenamu–Queens Park in central Whanganui, formerly the hilltop location of the Rutland Stockade, is home to several iconic buildings. The Sarjeant Gallery, a Category I Historic Place, was a bequest to the town by local farmer Henry Sarjeant, and opened in 1919. Since 2014 it has been in temporary premises on Taupo Quay while the heritage building is strengthened and redeveloped. The Whanganui Regional Museum (1928) and the Alexander Heritage and Research Library (1933) were both bequests of the Alexander family. The award-winning Whanganui War Memorial Hall (1960) is one of New Zealand's finest examples of modernist architecture.

The Royal Whanganui Opera House is located in St Hill Street in central Whanganui.

Stewart House on the corner of Campbell and Plymouth Streets is now a private home, but it was formerly the Karitane Home and later a boarding residence for secondary school students. It was built for philanthropist John Tiffin Stewart and social activist Frances Ann Stewart.

There are two large towers overlooking Whanganui: the Durie Hill War Memorial Tower and the Bastia Hill Water Tower. The Durie Hill Tower is a World War I memorial, unveiled in 1926. Nearby is the Durie Hill Elevator (1919), which links the hilltop with Anzac Parade via a  elevator and a  tunnel. South of Whanganui is the Cameron Blockhouse.
Rotokawau Virginia Lake, located on St John's Hill, is a historic lake with a fountain, Art Deco conservatory and winter garden.

Social and religious history

Early institutions

Karitane Hospital
Wanganui Orphanage
Alma Gardens

People, early recorders of social history
Richard Taylor was one of the early missionaries and travelled widely through the region.
William Tyrone Power
Edward Jerningham Wakefield

Contemporary institutions
The Society of St Pius X's main base of operations in New Zealand is in Whanganui.

Sports

Rugby
The Wanganui Rugby Football Union is one of the oldest rugby unions in New Zealand.

Wanganui has never held the country's top trophy, the Ranfurly Shield.

On 10 August 1966 a combined Wanganui and King Country team beat the British and Irish Lions 12 points to 6 at Spriggens Park.

In 2008 the Wanganui representative rugby team, under the captaincy of David Gower, won the NZRFU's Heartland Championship (Meads Cup) by defeating Mid Canterbury 27–12 in the final. They had previously been the defeated finalist in 2006 and 2007. The 2008 side had an undefeated season – the first since 1947. The rugby squad, including coach and management, was accorded the honour of 'Freedom of the City' by the Whanganui District Council – the first time the award had been given to any sporting team.

The 2009 representative team repeated this feat by regaining the Meads Cup – again defeating Mid Canterbury in the final by 34 points to 13 (after trailing nil-13 at halftime). Unlike 2008, the 2009 did lose games (to Wellington, Wairarapa Bush and Mid Canterbury) but came good at the business end of the season. Ten Whanganui players were selected for the Heartland XV.

The Wanganui rugby jersey, due to its resemblance, is known as the butcher's apron.

The Whanganui environs have produced many All Blacks including:

Moke Belliss (1920–23).
John Blair (1897).
George Bullock-Douglas (1932–34).
Andrew Donald (1981–84).
Keith Gudsell (1949). He also played three tests for the Wallabies.
Andy Haden (1972–85).
Peter Henderson (1949–50).
John Hogan (1907). He also played for New Zealand at rugby league (1913) and was a national waterpolo champion.
Peter Arthur Johns (1968).
Peter McDonnell (1896).
Alasdair "Sandy" McNicol (1973).
Henare "Buff" Milner (1970).
Peter Murray (1908).
Bill Osborne (1975–82).
Glen Osborne (1995–99).
Waate "Pat" Potaka (1923).
Harrison Rowley (1949).
Peina Taituha also known as Taituha Peina Kingi (1923).
Hector "Mona" Thomson (1905–08).
 
Although from the Manawatu, 1987 Rugby World Cup winning All Black Captain David Kirk was a student at Wanganui Collegiate School.

Athletics
Whanganui has several high-quality sporting venues including Cooks Gardens, a major sporting venue used for cricket, athletics and rugby. On 27 January 1962, a world record time of 3 minutes 54.4 seconds for running the mile was set by Peter Snell on the grass track at the gardens. The venue also has a world-class velodrome.

Motor-racing
The Cemetery Circuit is a temporary motorcycle street racetrack in downtown Whanganui which passes through the old cemetery and industrial area near to the centre of town. The event is usually held on Boxing Day each year.

Rod Coleman was a Grand Prix motorcycle road racer.

Earl Bamber was a racing driver and winner of the 2015 24 Hours of Le Mans and 2014 Porsche Supercup.

Horse racing

The Wanganui Jockey Club operates at the Wanganui Racecourse, Purnell Street where it has been since 1848, said to be the oldest racing club In New Zealand still operating on its original land.

Important races held include the:
Ag Challenge Stakes.
H S Dyke Wanganui Guineas.
Fillies Series.
Wanganui Cup.

New Zealand Racing Hall of Fame and Australian Racing Hall of Fame jockey Brent Thomson was born and started his career in Wanganui.

The Wanganui Trotting Club now holds meetings at the Palmerston North track.

Infrastructure

Transport
Whanganui Airport is served by Air Chathams with flights to Auckland.

Horizons Regional Council, under their Go! brand, contracts ten weekday urban bus routes within the city and a Saturday route which combines parts of four of the routes to serve the northern part of the city. From 18 February 2023 a 'frequent' (20-minute interval, except Sunday) bus links Castlecliff and Aramoho, though most routes are 2-hourly. The regional council also runs commuter buses to Palmerston North, and monthly buses from Taihape. The services are all operated by Tranzit Group. Go cards were replaced by Bee cards in December 2019.

Whanganui had trams between Aramoho and Castlecliff from 1908 to 1950, when they were replaced by Greyhound buses. Greyhound was taken over by Tranzit in 1995.

The township was also served by a passenger rail train running to New Plymouth until this was cancelled in July 1977. Today the line is used for freight.

Energy
The Wanganui-Rangitikei Electric Power Board was established in 1921 to supply the city and surrounding areas with electricity. The city was connected to Mangahao hydroelectric scheme on 23 April 1926, following the completion of the transmission line from Bunnythorpe to Whanganui and the Whanganui substation. The Energy Companies Act 1992 saw the power board corporatise and merge with the New Plymouth Municipal Electricity Department and the Taranaki Electric Power Board to become Powerco. Powerco sold its retail base to Genesis Energy as part of the 1998 electricity sector reforms and continued as an electricity distribution business.

Whanganui was one of the original nine towns and cities in New Zealand to be supplied with natural gas when the Kapuni gas field entered production in 1970 and a 260 km high pressure pipeline from Kapuni to Wellington via the city was completed. The high pressure transmission pipelines supplying the city are now owned and operated by First Gas, with GasNet owning and operating the medium and low pressure distribution pipelines within the city.

Education
Whanganui Collegiate School is in Liverpool Street, central Whanganui. It was founded by a land grant in 1852 by the Governor of New Zealand, Sir George Grey, to the Bishop of New Zealand, George Augustus Selwyn, for the purpose of establishing a school. It was originally a boys-only school but in 1991 began admitting girls at senior levels and went fully co-educational in 1999. The school celebrated its 150th anniversary in 2004. The school amalgamated with St George's School in 2010. The combined schools provide primary education for day students on the St George campus, and secondary education for day and boarding students on the Collegiate campus. Prince Edward, Earl of Wessex, spent two terms spanning 1982 and 1983 at the school as a junior master during his gap year.
Whanganui City College is located in Ingestre Street, central Whanganui, and has had three names. Wanganui Technical College, established in 1911, became Wanganui Boys' College in 1964 and in 1994 it became Wanganui City College.
Whanganui High School is in Purnell Street.
Whanganui Girls' College is in Jones Street, Whanganui East, near the Dublin Street Bridge.
Cullinane College is an integrated, co-educational college in Peat Street, Aramoho.
St. Dominic's College is in York Street, Gonville.
Te Kura Kaupapa Māori o Te Atihaunui-A-Paparangi is in Anaua Street, Putiki.
Te Kura o Kokohuia is in Matipo Street, Castlecliff.
Te Kura Kaupapa Māori o Tupoho is in Cross Street, Castlecliff.
UCOL, Universal College of Learning, was founded in 1907 and was known as the Palmerston North Technical School. In 1971 it became the Palmerston North Technical Institute and in 1983 the Manawatu Polytechnic. At the time it specialised in trade apprenticeship courses, and in hobby, art, and craft classes, along with a range of night school programmes in business studies for working adults. UCOL expanded in January 2001 with the incorporation of the Wairarapa Regional Polytechnic and the integration of the Whanganui Regional Community Polytechnic on 1 April 2002.
The Wanganui Regional Community Polytechnic is now called Whanganui UCOL and incorporates the Wanganui School of Design.

Media
Whanganui has three local newspapers. Whanganui was the first town in the wider Wellington region to have its own newspaper, the Wanganui Record, which was first published in 1853. The Whanganui Chronicle, founded in 1856, is New Zealand's oldest newspaper, and has been a daily paper since 1871. Its rival from the 1860s onward was the Evening Herald (later the Wanganui Herald), founded by John Ballance.  Initially, the production of the Wanganui Chronicle was held back by a lack of equipment, meaning the first issue, dated 18 September 1856, was produced on a makeshift press, made by staff and pupils at the local industrial school. Shortly afterwards, the founder, Henry Stokes, imported a press from Sydney. The two daily papers joined in the 1970s, and in 1986 the Herald became a free weekly, later renamed the Wanganui Midweek. The River City Press is the other free weekly paper.

Whanganui is served by 25 radio stations: 22 on FM and three on AM. In 1996, Whanganui briefly rose to international infamy when a man who claimed to be carrying a bomb held local radio station Star FM (now More FM Whanganui) hostage and demanded that the station broadcast The Muppets song "The Rainbow Connection" for 12 hours.

Television coverage reached Whanganui in 1963, after the Wharite Peak transmitter near Palmerston North was commissioned to relay Wellington's WNTV1 channel. Due to terrain blocking the Wharite signal to parts of the city, coverage was supplemented by a translator at Mount Jowett in Aramoho. Today, digital terrestrial television (Freeview) is available in the city from both Wharite and Mount Jowett.

Notable people

Sister Mary Joseph Aubert, founder of Our Lady of Compassion at Jerusalem
Harriet Austin, rower who rowed 200 miles across the Mediterranean
John Ballance, politician and businessman
Ellen Ballance, suffragist and community worker
Earl Bamber, racing driver
Airini Beautrais, poet
Annie Maude Blackett, librarian
John Bryce, politician
Rangiahuta Alan Herewini Ruka Broughton, tohunga, Anglican priest and university lecturer
Brit Bunkley, artist
Paul Callaghan, physicist
Edith Collier, artist
Johnny Devlin, musician
Samuel Henry Drew, jeweller and founder of the Whanganui Regional Museum
Dave Feickert, international mines safety advisor
Henry Augustus Field, surveyor
Janet Gillies, nurse
Peter Gordon, International chef and restaurant owner
Michael Laws, former mayor
Douglas Lilburn, composer
Te Mamaku, Māori chief
Pura McGregor, community leader
Robert Martin, disability rights activist
Jerry Mateparae, former Chief of the New Zealand Defence Force and Governor General of New Zealand
Christodoulos Moisa, poet, writer, and art teacher
Peter Nicholls, sculptor
Anne Noble, photographer
Simon Owen, professional golfer, the 1976 International Double Diamond individual golf champion and winner of 17 tournaments around the world 
Brian Perkins, broadcaster and musician
Paul Rayner, artist
Victoria Ransom, software entrepreneur
Iriaka Rātana, first woman to represent Māori in New Zealand parliament
Herbert Reeve, Vicar of Wanganui 1911 to 1924
Helen Rockel, painter
Henry Sarjeant, farmer and benefactor of the Sarjeant Art Gallery
Maxwell James Grant Smart, farmer, museum director, historian, archaeologist and writer
Frances Ann Stewart, social activist
Richard Taylor, early missionary at Putiki
John Tiffin Stewart, engineer, artist and philanthropist
Brian Talboys, politician
James Allen Ward, Victoria Cross winner
Emily White, gardener and writer
Jane Winstone, aviator
Tim Seifert, cricketer

Sister cities

 Toowoomba, Queensland, Australia since 1983
 Nagaizumi, Shizuoka, Japan since 1988

The Wanganui District Council decided in 2008 to formally end its sister city relationship with Reno, Nevada, USA after years of inactivity. The relationship was parodied on "The Prefect of Wanganui" episode of Reno 911!.

Image gallery

References

External links

Gigapan image: Whanganui City and River, 1 Nov 2010
Whanganui in Te Ara: the Encyclopedia of New Zealand
Video on the correct pronunciation of Whanganui

 
Populated places in Manawatū-Whanganui
Port cities in New Zealand
Whanganui River
Geographical naming disputes
Settlements on the Whanganui River